Justice Craig may refer to:

Alfred M. Craig, associate justice of the Supreme Court of Illinois
Charles C. Craig, associate justice of the Supreme Court of Illinois